The Duma of Khanty-Mansi Autonomous Okrug — Yugra is the regional parliament of Khanty-Mansi Autonomous Okrug, a federal subject of Russia. A total of 38 deputies are elected for five-year terms.

Elections

2021

References

Khanty-Mansi Autonomous Okrug
Politics of Khanty-Mansi Autonomous Okrug